During the 1991–92 English football season, Leicester City F.C. competed in the Football League Second Division.

Season summary
After narrowly avoiding relegation to the Third Division the previous season, Leicester City appointed Darlington manager Brian Little as the replacement for David Pleat, who had been sacked during the previous season. Little turned Leicester's fortunes around and the club finished in fourth, qualifying for the play-offs. After drawing 1–1 with fifth-placed Cambridge United at Abbey Stadium, Leicester crushed United 5–0 in the return leg at Filbert Street to qualify for the final. Leicester faced Blackburn Rovers at Wembley, but lost 1–0 from a penalty from former City player Mike Newell, thus denying Leicester a place in the inaugural season of the Premiership.

Final league table

Results
Leicester City's score comes first

Legend

Football League Second Division

Second Division play-offs

FA Cup

League Cup

Full Members Cup

Squad

Transfers

In

Out

Transfers in:  £520,000
Transfers out:  £1,650,000
Total spending:  £1,130,000

References

Leicester City F.C. seasons
Leicester City